In computer science, a control-flow graph (CFG) is a representation, using graph notation, of all paths that might be traversed through a program during its execution. The control-flow graph was discovered by Frances E. Allen, who noted that Reese T. Prosser used boolean connectivity matrices for flow analysis before.

The CFG is essential to many compiler optimizations and static-analysis tools.

Definition 
In a control-flow graph each node in the graph represents a basic block, i.e. a straight-line piece of code without any jumps or jump targets; jump targets start a block, and jumps end a block. Directed edges are used to represent jumps in the control flow. There are, in most presentations, two specially designated blocks: the entry block, through which control enters into the flow graph, and the exit block, through which all control flow leaves.

Because of its construction procedure, in a CFG, every edge A→B has the property that:
 outdegree(A) > 1 or indegree(B) > 1 (or both).

The CFG can thus be obtained, at least conceptually, by starting from the program's (full) flow graph—i.e. the graph in which every node represents an individual instruction—and performing an edge contraction for every edge that falsifies the predicate above, i.e. contracting every edge whose source has a single exit and whose destination has a single entry. This contraction-based algorithm is of no practical importance, except as a visualization aid for understanding the CFG construction, because the CFG can be more efficiently constructed directly from the program by scanning it for basic blocks.

Example
Consider the following fragment of code:
0: (A) t0 = read_num
1: (A) if t0 mod 2 == 0
2: (B)   print t0 + " is even."
3: (B)   goto 5
4: (C) print t0 + " is odd."
5: (D) end program
In the above, we have 4 basic blocks: A from 0 to 1, B from 2 to 3, C at 4 and D at 5. In particular, in this case, A is the "entry block", D the "exit block" and lines 4 and 5 are jump targets. A graph for this fragment has edges from A to B, A to C, B to D and C to D.

Reachability 

Reachability is a graph property useful in optimization.

If a subgraph is not connected from the subgraph containing the entry block, that subgraph is unreachable during any execution, and so is unreachable code; under normal conditions it can be safely removed.

If the exit block is unreachable from the entry block, an infinite loop may exist. Not all infinite loops are detectable, see Halting problem. A halting order may also exist there.

Unreachable code and infinite loops are possible even if the programmer does not explicitly code them: optimizations like constant propagation and constant folding followed by jump threading can collapse multiple basic blocks into one, cause edges to be removed from a CFG, etc., thus possibly disconnecting parts of the graph.

Domination relationship

A block M dominates a block N if every path from the entry that reaches block N has to pass through block M. The entry block dominates all blocks.

In the reverse direction, block M postdominates block N if every path from N to the exit has to pass through block M. The exit block postdominates all blocks.

It is said that a block M immediately dominates block N if M dominates N, and there is no intervening block P such that M dominates P and P dominates N. In other words, M is the last dominator on all paths from entry to N. Each block has a unique immediate dominator.

Similarly, there is a notion of immediate postdominator, analogous to immediate dominator.

The dominator tree is an ancillary data structure depicting the dominator relationships. There is an arc from Block M to Block N if M is an immediate dominator of N. This graph is a tree, since each block has a unique immediate dominator. This tree is rooted at the entry block. The dominator tree can be calculated efficiently using Lengauer–Tarjan's algorithm.

A postdominator tree is analogous to the dominator tree. This tree is rooted at the exit block.

Special edges

A back edge is an edge that points to a block that has already been met during a depth-first (DFS) traversal of the graph. Back edges are typical of loops.

A critical edge is an edge which is neither the only edge leaving its source block, nor the only edge entering its destination block. These edges must be split: a new block must be created in the middle of the edge, in order to insert computations on the edge without affecting any other edges.

An abnormal edge is an edge whose destination is unknown. Exception handling constructs can produce them. These edges tend to inhibit optimization.

An impossible edge (also known as a fake edge) is an edge which has been added to the graph solely to preserve the property that the exit block postdominates all blocks. It cannot ever be traversed.

Loop management

A loop header (sometimes called the entry point of the loop) is a dominator that is the target of a loop-forming back edge. The loop header dominates all blocks in the loop body.  A block may be a loop header for more than one loop.  A loop may have multiple entry points, in which case it has no "loop header".

Suppose block M is a dominator with several incoming edges, some of them being back edges (so M is a loop header). It is advantageous to several optimization passes to break M up into two blocks Mpre and Mloop. The contents of M and back edges are moved to Mloop, the rest of the edges are moved to point into Mpre, and a new edge from Mpre to Mloop is inserted (so that Mpre is the immediate dominator of Mloop). In the beginning, Mpre would be empty, but passes like loop-invariant code motion could populate it. Mpre is called the loop pre-header, and Mloop would be the loop header.

Reducibility 

A reducible CFG is one with edges that can be partitioned into two disjoint sets: forward edges, and back edges, such that:

 Forward edges form a directed acyclic graph with all nodes reachable from the entry node.
 For all back edges (A, B), node B dominates node A.

Structured programming languages are often designed such that all CFGs they produce are reducible, and common structured programming statements such as IF, FOR, WHILE, BREAK, and CONTINUE produce reducible graphs. To produce irreducible graphs, statements such as GOTO are needed.  Irreducible graphs may also be produced by some compiler optimizations.

Loop connectedness 
The loop connectedness of a CFG is defined with respect to a given depth-first search tree (DFST) of the CFG. This DFST should be rooted at the start node and cover every node of the CFG.

Edges in the CFG which run from a node to one of its DFST ancestors (including itself) are called back edges.

The loop connectedness is the largest number of back edges found in any cycle-free path of the CFG. In a reducible CFG, the loop connectedness is independent of the DFST chosen.

Loop connectedness has been used to reason about the time complexity of data-flow analysis.

Inter-procedural Control Flow Graph 

While Control Flow Graphs represent the control flow of a single procedure, Inter-procedural Control Flow Graphs represent the control flow of whole programs.

See also
 Abstract syntax tree
 Flowchart
 Control-flow diagram
 Control-flow analysis
 Data-flow analysis
 Interval (graph theory)
 Program dependence graph
 Cyclomatic complexity
 Static single assignment
 Compiler construction
 Intermediate representation

References

External links

The Machine-SUIF Control Flow Graph Library
GNU Compiler Collection Internals
Paper "Infrastructure for Profile Driven Optimizations in GCC Compiler" by Zdeněk Dvořák et al.

Examples
Avrora – Control-Flow Graph Tool

Compiler construction

Application-specific graphs
Modeling languages